The Fifth Atkinson Ministry was a responsible government  in New Zealand, serving from October 1887 to January 1891. It was the last non-party government of New Zealand.

Background
The House of Representatives was split between several different factions after the 1887 general election. The Opposition to the Stout-Vogel Government had been led by John Bryce, but he lost his seat at this election and the leadership of his grouping passed back to ex-Premier Harry Atkinson, who now became Premier. The Atkinson Ministry tended to govern with the support of free-trader rural conservatives as a means of keeping John Ballance out of power. Their policy was to retrench public spending and raise taxes to make the Budget balance during the long depression of the 1880s, while also promoting growth with a small loan for public works expenditure, along with promotion of local industry and closer settlement of the land. To do this, the Atkinson Ministry favoured “modest protectionism” and the legalisation of direct purchase of Māori land without the purchasers going through the Crown as an intermediary.

The free-traders objected to Atkinson’s proposed Tariff of 1888, which ended up passing with the support of the followers of John Ballance and Sir George Grey, later to sweep the Atkinsonites out of power as the new Liberal Party. Other policies of this government which offended its conservative supporters included bills to establish fair rents, an eight hour working day and minimum wages for working men, and to abolish plural voting. Only the last of these was passed. This was a time of mounting labour unrest, typified by the international Maritime Strike of 1890, during which the government paid the rail fares of the union negotiators.

Despite lasting for several years, the government was generally regarded as a weak and disunified one, bringing together Ministers like George Fisher, who disagreed with the Premier on Education funding – when he resigned, he submitted “a 60-page document outlining his concerns with the Government administration”. Another Minister, T. W. Hislop, had described Atkinson as “communistic” at an election meeting and was later sacked for using his Ministerial position to aid the business affairs of his personal friends. For the 1890 session of Parliament, Atkinson was too ill to speak, and he died in 1892 – he repeatedly offered his resignation to Cabinet, but they rejected it on the grounds that no other leader could hope to command a stable majority.

At the 1890 general election, the Government was defeated at the polls by the Liberal Party; however, it wasn’t clear initially whether the Liberals had a majority, so Atkinson remained Premier until the House met in early 1891. Some supporters advised the Government to create a batch of Legislative Councillors when they resigned in order to block Liberal policies – however, the Governor only agreed to appoint six, and later made more for the new Liberal Government.

Ministers
The following members served in the fifth Atkinson Ministry:

See also
 New Zealand Government

Notes

References

Ministries of Queen Victoria
Governments of New Zealand
Atkinson Ministry
Atkinson Ministry
Atkinson Ministry